Varazhnuni was a noble house of old Armenia that ruled the district of Varazhnunik.

See also
List of regions of old Armenia

Varazhnuni family